Petar Franjić (born 21 August 1991) is a Croatian footballer who plays as a midfielder for NK Ravnice.

Club career
Franjić started his football career at the age of 7, playing for Croatia Sesvete. There he passed through all their youth categories. In 2007, he was transferred to Dinamo Zagreb. He played there in the cadets and juniors sections. In January 2010 he was moved to Dinamo Zagreb's affiliated club, Lokomotiva, where he played in the senior team, along with some other Dinamo's youngsters, in order to gain some experience in the Croatian top football league, Prva HNL.

His first official appearance for Lokomotiva's was on 25 February at Maksimir Stadium, when he replaced Nino Bule. At the end of the season he was moved further down the rank, on loan from Lokomotiva to another affiliated club, Radnik Sesvete, in the Treća HNL Zapad.

His games earned him a professional contract back at Dinamo after six months, in January 2011, but he was again moved to Radnik where he spent the rest of the season. He, then, spent two further years on loan at Radnik, playing in the Druga HNL, before he was sent on loan to the Prva HNL team NK Istra 1961 in July 2013. A year after he signed a professional contract with the club from Pula and played a significant role in Istra team.

After several months of not receiving wages in Istra, he left the club and joined another Prva liga side RNK Split in summer 2015. His most memorable performance during his time in Split was the match against his former club Dinamo on 30 October 2015, when he scored the winning goal in a 1-0 victory. Nearly a year later, Franjić had similar problems with payment and he decided to search for a new club.

On 31 August 2016, Franjić signed a two-year contract with Azerbaijan Premier League side Gabala.

On 23 January 2017, he signed a two-and-a-half-year contract with Slovenian team Domžale. In 2018, Franjić joined Široki Brijeg. He left Široki Brijeg on 1 June 2020 after his contract with the club expired.

Career statistics

Club

References

External links
 

1991 births
Living people
Footballers from Zagreb
Association football wingers
Croatian footballers
NK Lokomotiva Zagreb players
NK Sesvete players
NK Istra 1961 players
RNK Split players
Gabala FC players
NK Domžale players
NK Široki Brijeg players
NK Zagorec Krapina players
Croatian Football League players
First Football League (Croatia) players
Azerbaijan Premier League players
Slovenian PrvaLiga players
Premier League of Bosnia and Herzegovina players 
Second Football League (Croatia) players
Croatian expatriate footballers
Croatian expatriate sportspeople in Azerbaijan
Expatriate footballers in Azerbaijan
Croatian expatriate sportspeople in Slovenia
Expatriate footballers in Slovenia
Croatian expatriate sportspeople in Bosnia and Herzegovina
Expatriate footballers in Bosnia and Herzegovina